Euphorbia nereidum, called the nerium-leaved spurge, is a species of flowering plant in the genus Euphorbia, native to Morocco. It has gained the Royal Horticultural Society's Award of Garden Merit.

References

nereidum
Endemic flora of Morocco
Plants described in 1923